Koidma is a village in Hiiumaa Parish, Hiiu County in northwestern Estonia. It has five inhabitants as per 2011 census. Koidma is 8 km away from the capital Kärdla.

External links
 Koidma population data

References

Villages in Hiiu County